Henrik Širko (born January 23, 1993) is a Croatian professional basketball player currently playing for Golden Eagle Ylli of the Kosovo Basketball Superleague. Standing at 1.98 m, he plays at the small forward position.

Professional career 
Širko started playing basketball in his home town of Šibenik, but never spent much time on court until he moved to Kvarner coached by Aramis Naglić. He spent a season in Zadar before moving to Split. After spending three seasons there affirming himself as one of the key players of the club, in July 2018 he signed with the Greek Peristeri.

In August 2019, he joined Zabok of the Croatian League, signing an open contract allowing him to leave the club easily if a better offer occurred. Without playing a single game for Zabok, in September 2019, Širko moved to Peja of the Kosovo Superleague.

On August 8, 2020, Širko returned to his hometown signing with Šibenka of the Croatian League.

Širko returned to Peja of the Kosovo Basketball Superleague at the start of the 2021–22 season. In December, 2021, he moved to Golden Eagle Ylli playing in the same league.

References

External links
 Profile at eurobasket.com
 Profile at archive.fiba.com
 Profile at realgm.com

Living people
1993 births
ABA League players
Croatian men's basketball players
Basketball players from Šibenik
KK Zadar players
KK Split players
Peristeri B.C. players
Small forwards
KB Peja players
GKK Šibenik players
KK Kvarner 2010 players
KB Ylli players